The People’s Pension is a United Kingdom trust based defined contribution workplace pension scheme for non-associated employers, commonly referred to as a 'master trust'.

History
The UK Pensions Act 2008 established new duties which require employers to automatically enrol eligible workers into a workplace pension plan that meets certain minimum standards. The People's Pension was set up by B&CE in 2011 for employers requiring a scheme to fulfil their duties under the Act from October 2012. In September 2014 The People's Pension announced that it had accepted its one millionth member.

References

External links
 B&CE Website
 The People's Pension website
 The Report & Accounts for The People's Pension for the year ending 31 March 2014
 Pensions World article covering the announcement of the 500,000th member of The People's Pension in February 2014
 "People's Pension first master trust to gain independent assurance", Professional Pensions article covering the joint assurance framework established by TPR and the ICAEW

Pensions in the United Kingdom
2011 establishments in the United Kingdom